Walker House, also known as the William Walker House, is a historic home located at Warren, Albemarle County, Virginia. It was built between 1803 and 1805, and is a one-story, three-bay hipped-roof brick house on a high English basement. It has a one-story, one-bay, shed-roofed brick addition built in 1978. It was built by James Walker, a long time employee of Thomas Jefferson.

It was added to the National Register of Historic Places in 1990.

References

Houses on the National Register of Historic Places in Virginia
Houses completed in 1805
Houses in Albemarle County, Virginia
National Register of Historic Places in Albemarle County, Virginia
1805 establishments in Virginia